Li Xiaomei (born August 20, 1987 in Dongguan, Guangdong) is a female Chinese freestyle wrestler. She competed at the 2008 Summer Olympics.

Her personal best was coming 3rd at the 2007 World Championships.

External links
 profile

1987 births
Living people
Chinese female sport wrestlers
Olympic wrestlers of China
People from Dongguan
Wrestlers at the 2008 Summer Olympics
Asian Games medalists in wrestling
Sportspeople from Guangdong
Wrestlers at the 2006 Asian Games
Medalists at the 2006 Asian Games
Asian Games bronze medalists for China
21st-century Chinese women